Maitri Bagh Zoo (also known as Garden of Friendship) is tourist place located in the Bhilai, India which was established as a symbol of friendship between Soviet Union and India. It is the largest and oldest zoo of Chhattisgarh and Madhya Pradesh.

History 

Maitri Bagh is a "Friendship Garden" established as symbol of India-Soviet Union friendship. It was developed and maintained by Bhilai Steel Plant. It was established in the year 1972.

Photo Gallery

References 

Buildings and structures in Chhattisgarh
Buildings and structures in Bhilai
Zoos in India